In mathematics, a Suslin tree is a tree of height ω1 such that
every branch and every antichain is at most countable. They are named after Mikhail Yakovlevich Suslin.

Every Suslin tree is an Aronszajn tree.

The existence of a Suslin tree is independent of ZFC, and is equivalent to the existence of a Suslin line (shown by ) or a Suslin algebra. The diamond principle, a consequence of V=L,  implies that there is a Suslin tree, and Martin's axiom MA(ℵ1) implies that there are no Suslin trees.

More generally, for any infinite cardinal κ, a κ-Suslin tree is a tree of height κ such that every branch and antichain has cardinality less than κ. In particular a Suslin tree is the same as a ω1-Suslin tree.   showed that if V=L then there is a κ-Suslin tree for every infinite successor cardinal κ. Whether the Generalized Continuum Hypothesis implies the existence of an ℵ2-Suslin tree, is a longstanding open problem.

See also 
 Glossary of set theory
 Kurepa tree
 List of statements independent of ZFC
 List of unsolved problems in set theory
 Suslin's problem

References
Thomas Jech, Set Theory, 3rd millennium ed., 2003, Springer Monographs in Mathematics,Springer, 
 erratum, ibid. 4 (1972), 443.

Trees (set theory)
Independence results